Furniss is a surname.
 Notable people with the surname include:

 Brian Furniss (John Brian Furniss 1934–2013), English cricketer
 Bruce Furniss (born 1957), American swimmer
 Delma Furniss (1934-2022), American politician
 Fred Furniss (1922–2017), English footballer
 Harry Furniss (1854–1925), artist and illustrator
 Henry Sanderson Furniss, 1st Baron Sanderson (1868–1939), English academic, socialist, principal of Ruskin College, Oxford
 Jack Furniss (John Kitchener Furniss, 1914–2003), Australian rules footballer
 John Furniss (disambiguation)
John Furniss (priest) (1809–1865), English Roman Catholic priest
John Furniss (costume designer) (born 1935), British costume designer
 Lawrence Furniss (1862–1941), English footballer
 Maureen Furniss (21st century), writer, animation historian, animation theorist, critic, and professor
 Stephen Furniss (1875–1952), Canadian politician and farmer
 Steve Furniss (born 1952), American swimmer

References